The orders, decorations, and medals of the German states, in which each states of Germany has devised a system of orders and awards to honour residents for actions or deeds that benefit their local community or state, are in turn subsumed within the German honours system. Each state sets their own rules and criteria on eligibility and also how each medal is awarded and presented. Most of the orders allow for the recipient to wear their orders in public.

History
Most of the orders have the form of a maltese cross.

Hanseatic rejection
The city states of Bremen and Hamburg do not allocate any orders. An exception was made during World War I when the Hanseatic Cross was awarded jointly with the city of Lübeck. Even today, senators of the two states reject any foreign orders. Former German chancellor Helmut Schmidt received a number of accolades, among them was the Grand Cross of the Order of Merit of the Federal Republic of Germany, which he chose not to accept in Hanseatic tradition, in order to refuse any decoration presented for merely fulfilling one's duty.

State orders

State medals

Bavaria
 Bavarian Constitution Medal (until 2011)
 Bavarian Lifesaving Medal

Berlin
 Berlin Lifesaving Medal
 Louise-Schroeder-Medaille

Hamburg
 Bürgermeister-Stolten-Medaille
 Biermann-Ratjen-Medaille

Hesse
 Wilhelm-Leuschner-Medaille

Lower Saxony
 Niedersächsische Landesmedaille

Rhineland-Palatinate
 Verdienstmedaille des Landes Rheinland-Pfalz

Saxony
 Saxon Constitutional Medal
 Johann-Georg-Palitzsch-Medaille

See also 
 Orders, decorations, and medals of Germany

References 

Orders, decorations, and medals of Germany